The Vaslui is a right tributary of the river Oltișor in Romania. It flows into the Oltișor in Găneasa.

References

Rivers of Romania
Rivers of Olt County